The 2007 Syracuse Orange football team competed in football on behalf of Syracuse University during the 2007 NCAA Division I FBS football season. The Orange were coached by Greg Robinson and played their home games at the Carrier Dome in Syracuse, New York.

Schedule

Game summaries

Washington

Syracuse opened the 2007 season with a 42-14 loss to Washington in the Carrier Dome. The Orange began the game with a field goal and managed to hold the Huskies at bay for their first two drives. However, after back-to-back three-and-outs, Washington responded with two touchdown drives of 80 yards apiece.  The Huskies scored on each of their three drives in the third quarter to take a 35-6 lead into the fourth quarter.

Freshman quarterback Andrew Robinson registered 199 yards in his first career start on 20-of-32 passing.  Robinson was also sacked seven times.  Washington was led on the ground by Louis Rankin.  The senior ran for 152 yards on 17 carries.  Rankin scored three touchdowns, including a 47-yard run on the opening drive of the third quarter.  Huskies quarterback Jake Locker completed 14-of-19 passes for 142 yards.  He also ran for two touchdowns in the win.  Washington outgained Syracuse 302-8 on the ground.

"We went on defense and had a chance to make a four or five-yard loss on a run and we missed the tackle," said Orange head coach Greg Robinson after the game.  "We had the tackle, but we didn't secure it and let the guy out the backside and that's just the discipline of the defense not having backside containment to let that guy out the backdoor. Really I thought for a period of time we kept shooting ourselves in the foot on both sides of the ball. I give credit to Washington. They did a good job."

Iowa

Syracuse and Iowa met in a rematch of the 2006 thriller in the Carrier Dome.  The Orange fell 20-13 in double overtime to the Hawkeyes, after the 'Cuse couldn't score on seven attempts from inside the two-yard line.

The 2007 meeting between the two teams was the exact opposite of the 2006 matchup.  Syracuse fell to Iowa 35-0.  After a punt on their opening drive, the Hawkeyes scored three consecutive touchdowns, two on passes of more than 30 yards.  Iowa quarterback Jake Christensen connected with Tony Moeaki on a 52-yard touchdown pass to give the Hawkeyes a 7-0 lead.  Christensen found running back Albert Young for a 36-yard touchdown reception a drive later, after Iowa picked off Syracuse in its own half of the field.

Syracuse's scoring chances were limited to two field goal attempts. Orange kicker Patrick Shadle had a 38 and a 39 yard attempt blocked in the loss.

The one bright spot for the 'Cuse came on the defensive end.  Despite giving up 35 points in the defeat, Syracuse caught two interceptions and forced on fumble.  The first interception came late in the first half off a pass from Christensen.

Illinois

Syracuse's second straight Big Ten opponent came when the 'Cuse met Illinois.  The Orange had defeated the Illini a year before, 31-21 in Champaign.  Much like the previous week in Iowa, Syracuse struggled to stop the Illinois offense.  The Illini opened the game with a 70-yard drive for a touchdown.  Illinois scored after six plays, the last a 22-yard touchdown pass from Juice Williams to tight end Jeff Cumberland.  The Illini scored later in the first quarter on a 2-yard run by Rashard Mendenhall.

Mendenhall wasn't through there.  He ran for two more touchdowns in the win, including a 50-yard run late in the third quarter.  Mendenhall totaled 150 yards on 16 carries and finished with 3 touchdowns.

Offensively for Syracuse, the Orange started out slow.  Syracuse didn't record a first down until the second quarter and didn't break through until the third quarter when kicker Patrick Shadle kicked for a 44-yard field goal. Syracuse scored a touchdown later in the third off a 2-yard run by Jeremy Sellers.

The offensive improvements were outdone by Iowa.  The Hawkeyes finished the game with scores of their last five possessions.  Three of those drive resulted in touchdowns.

"Obviously, I’m frustrated and I want to keep working and getting better," said Syracuse head coach Greg Robinson after the game.  "There were some things in that game that we can still grow from and obviously we’re a team that is a work-in-progress, big time. I thought there were some things that were encouraging – especially on offensive side of the ball. I saw a couple of things on defense from a couple of young players and we’ll see what happens."

Louisville

Syracuse delivered its first win of the 2007 season on the road in Louisville.  The Orange upset the #18/19 Cardinals 38-35, thanks to an incredible offensive performance.  Freshman quarterback Andrew Robinson set the pace of the game early when he connected with wide receiver Taj Smith for a 79-yard touchdown reception on the first play.

The scoring halted until the second quarter when Louisville quarterback Brian Brohm completed a 4-yard touchdown pass to Scott Kuhn.  On the ensuing kickoff, Syracuse's Max Suter broke a tackle and sprinted for a 93-yard touchdown return, the first since Kevin Johnson returned a kick for 100 yards against Miami in 1998.

Miami (OH)

West Virginia

Rutgers

Buffalo

Pittsburgh

South Florida

Connecticut

Cincinnati

Rankings

Coaching staff

 Greg Robinson - Head Coach/Co-Defensive Coordinator
 Mitch Browning - Offensive Coordinator/Tight Ends & Offensive Tackles
 Derrick Jackson - Co-Defensive Coordinator/Defensive Line
 Phil Earley - Quarterbacks
 Dan Conley - Linebackers
 Jim Salgado - Cornerbacks/Secondary
 Scott Spencer - Safeties
 Randy Trivers - Running Backs
 Chris White - Wide Receivers
 Chris Wiesehan - Offensive Line

Statistics

Team

Scores by quarter

Offense

Rushing

Passing

Receiving

Defense Leaders
Note: This list includes only a select number of defensive leaders.  For the complete list, click

Special teams

References

Syracuse
Syracuse Orange football seasons
Syracuse Orange football